Alan Nicolás Marcel Picazzo (born 21 June 1999) is an Argentine professional footballer who plays as a right winger.

Club career
Marcel Picazzo's career began with local club Atlético Uruguay in 2003, which preceded his signing with River Plate in 2015. He was moved into the Primera División team's senior squad during 2017–18, making his professional bow during an away win against San Martín (SJ); he netted his first goal in the process, scoring the club's final goal of a 1–3 victory. After one further appearance for River across 2018–19, Marcel Picazzo was loaned out on 8 August 2019 to Primera B Nacional's Villa Dálmine. He debuted against San Martín (T) on 25 August, before netting his first goal on 2 November away to Quilmes.

Marcel Picazzo returned to River Plate in early 2020, though would terminate his contract in February 2021 after no further competitive appearances for them.

International career
Marcel Picazzo trained with the Argentina U20s in 2018.

Career statistics
.

References

External links

1999 births
Living people
People from Uruguay Department
Argentine footballers
Association football forwards
Argentine Primera División players
Primera Nacional players
Club Atlético River Plate footballers
Villa Dálmine footballers
Sportspeople from Entre Ríos Province